The  or esraaj (from the   Shahmukhi: اسراج) is an Indian stringed instrument found in two forms throughout the Indian subcontinent. It is a relatively recent instrument, being only about 300 years old. It is found in North India, primarily Punjab, where it is used in Sikh music and Hindustani classical compositions and in West Bengal.

By the 1980s, the instrument was nearly extinct. However, with the rising influence of the "Gurmat Sangeet" movement in an effort to revive the traditional instrumentation of Sikh Kirtan, the instrument has been once again attracting attention. Because of this,  is considered the main accompanying instrument for traditional .

History
The  was created some 300 years ago by the 10th Sikh guru, Guru Gobind Singh, who based it on the much older, and heavier, Taus. This made it more convenient for the Khalsa, the Sikh army, to carry the instrument on horseback.

Construction styles

This neck carries a long wooden rack of 12–15 sympathetic strings, known as the taraf strings, and 2-3 jawari strings. By the jawari strings, one can give emphasis on the vadi, samvadi, and nayeshwar notes, but jawari strings may not always be present. Jawari helps in producing a more piercing sound. The  has four main strings while the  has 6 both which are bowed. All strings are metal. The soundboard is a stretched piece of goatskin similar to what is found on a sarangi. Occasionally, the instrument has a gourd affixed to the top for balance or for tone enhancement.

This version is longer, with a wider fingerboard, and with an additional, diminutive "jawari" bridge near the peghead for the three drone strings. The newer model has a larger body, which is perforated in back, plus it has an open-backed, removable "tumba" behind the peghead.

Playing
The  can be rested between the knees while the player kneels, or more commonly rested on the knee of the player while sitting, or also on the floor just in front of the player, with the neck leaning on the left shoulder. Only the  players of  keep the  erect by resting it on their lap. It is played with a bow (known as a "gaz"), with the other hand moving along the strings over the frets. The player may slide the note up or down to achieve the portamento, or meend. The  can imitate the "gamak" of vocal music and by using the middle finger one can create "krintan". Roy used sitarbaz, sarodbaz and esrajbaz in his compositions.

Notable figures
Asian Music Circle, used in George Harrison's "Within You Without You"
Ranadhir Roy
Buddhadev Das
Pandit Shiv Dayal Batish
S. N. Bose
Kirpal Singh Panesar
Arshad Khan

See also 
Taus (instrument)
Sarangi
Sitar

References

External links 
Ashesh Banerjee - Visva Bharati
An instrument of change

Bowed string instruments
Drumhead lutes
Indian musical instruments
Sikh music
Necked bowl lutes
String instruments with sympathetic strings
Folk instruments of Punjab
Hindustani musical instruments